Nauset Beach is a public beach on the east coast of outer Cape Cod in Orleans, Massachusetts, which extends south from a point opposite Nauset Bay to the mouth of Chatham Harbor.  It is popular with swimmers, surfers, boogie boarders and fishermen.  It, at times, offers some of the highest waves on Cape Cod. Furthermore, it is an excellent spot to view a sunrise.

Facilities include restrooms, showers, snack bar, off-road vehicle trails (permit required), a bike rack and a picnic area.

Surfing is permitted in the non-protected beach areas from 9 a.m. to 6 p.m. The beach is also available for off-road vehicles with the proper permit. There is striped bass and bluefish fishing.

Nauset Beach has seen increases in erosion due to sea level rise and intense winter storms. Its iconic seaside clam shack, Liam's, was demolished after the beach next to the clam shack was destroyed by 20-foot waves during a 2018  storm.

Anne McCaffrey's novel The Mark of Merln is set in a home on the imaginary "Pull-In Point Road", overlooking Nauset Beach.

References

External links
 

Orleans, Massachusetts
Beaches of Massachusetts
Landforms of Barnstable County, Massachusetts
Tourist attractions in Barnstable County, Massachusetts